East Waterloo Township is one of seventeen rural townships in Black Hawk County, Iowa, United States.  As of the 2000 census, its population was 5936.

Geography
According to the USGS, it contains two cemeteries: George Wyth Memorial State Park and Mount Zion.

References

External links
US-Counties.com
City-Data.com

Townships in Black Hawk County, Iowa
Waterloo – Cedar Falls metropolitan area
Townships in Iowa